Elvina Beck is an American entrepreneur. She is known for co-founding Californian coliving company PodShare, where she also serves as CEO.

Early life and education
Beck was born in Moscow, USSR in 1985. In 1990 Beck emigrated to Brooklyn, New York City with her parents, Elvira and Antony. After an initial period of support from the Russian community in Brooklyn (a period which Beck has credited as formative in her positive views of community and sharing), the family moved to Livingston, New Jersey. Beck was educated at Livingston High School, and Pepperdine University, Malibu, graduating in Political Science in 2008.

Transition to videography 
In her early twenties, growing disaffected with the lack of control over her career that she felt as an actress and model, Beck taught herself how to operate a camera and to edit video.In her career as a camera operator, Beck has worked for, among others, Randi Zuckerberg, Avril Lavigne and Maxim Magazine.

PodShare 
In 2012, recognizing the lack of available, short-term housing for transitioners and freelancers, Beck co-founded coliving company PodShare with her father.

The company opened its first location in Hollywood, Los Angeles, and has since added locations in Los Feliz, Arts District, Venice Beach and Westwood in that city. In July 2019, PodShare opened its first location outside of Los Angeles in Tendernob, San Francisco, California.

PodShare has flexible residency, and a floorplan that excludes privacy and forces interactions between guests, which Beck calls "collisions".

Other pursuits 

Since 2015, Beck has served as President on the Central Hollywood Neighborhood Council. In 2019, she was re-elected to serve a second 4-year term.

Beck is an advocate for the unsheltered homeless of Los Angeles. In recognition of her ongoing non-profit work to improve the lives of the homeless, as well as the success of her startup PodShare in addressing urban affordability, Beck received the 2020 Stratiscope Impact Makers Award at Los Angeles City Hall on January 29, 2020.

References

External links 
 Official website for Elvina Beck
 Official website for PodShare

1985 births
Living people
People from Livingston, New Jersey
21st-century American businesswomen
21st-century American businesspeople
Soviet emigrants to the United States
Pepperdine University alumni
Livingston High School (New Jersey) alumni